96three is a Christian radio station serving Geelong and surrounding areas including Melbourne. Its studios are based in the Geelong suburb of Grovedale.

References

Radio stations in Geelong
Christian radio stations in Australia